The Divine Spark is a 1935 British musical film directed by Carmine Gallone and starring Marta Eggerth, Phillips Holmes, Benita Hume and Donald Calthrop. An Italian-language version Casta Diva was shot simultaneously. Both films were made at the Tirrenia Studios in Italy.

Cast
 Marta Eggerth as Maddalena Fumaroli
 Phillips Holmes as Vincenzo Bellini
 Benita Hume as Giuditta Pasta
 Donald Calthrop as Judge Fumaroli
 Arthur Margetson as Ernesto Tosi
 Edmund Breon as Gioacchino Rossini
 Basil Gill as Romanie
 Hugh Miller as Niccolo Paganini
 Edward Chapman as Saverio Mercadante
 John Clements as Fiorino
 John Deverell as King
 Felix Aylmer as Butler
 Peter Gawthorne as Felice Romani

References

External links

1935 films
1930s biographical films
1930s historical musical films
British historical musical films
British biographical films
Films directed by Carmine Gallone
Films set in Italy
Films set in 1831
Films about composers
Films about classical music and musicians
Films about opera
Films produced by Arnold Pressburger
British multilingual films
Films shot at Tirrenia Studios
British black-and-white films
Cultural depictions of Niccolò Paganini
1935 multilingual films
1930s English-language films
1930s British films